Coro di Nuoro is an Italian choir that performs popular and traditional Sardinian songs, including No potho reposare, Deus ti salvet Maria, the Miserere, and the Stabat Mater. Gian Paolo Mele is a former conductor of the choir.

History
The Coro di Nuoro was born in 1952 at the behest of a group of young music lovers, popular songs and popular traditions in particular of Nuoro and Barbagia. 
In 1955 the choir had participated and won the national radio music festival "Il campanile d'oro".
In 1965 the choir director became Gian Paolo Mele and, through his intense work, over the years, numerous melodies of the popular songs of Sardinia were recovered.
In addition, Mele had put to music several compositions of some Nuoro poets, making them real popular songs that have become heritage of the island culture, including: "Zia Tatana Faragone", "Adios, Nugoro Amada", "Sa crapola".

Discography
1966 – "La Sardegna nel canto e nella danza"
1971 – "Adios Nugoro amada"
1972 – "Coro di Nuoro" – 3 Audiocassette – Aedo
1975 – "Canti popolari della Sardegna", Tirsu, LP. 715 
1995 – "Antologia dei canti tradizionali della Sardegna"

See also
 Nuoro
 Music of Sardinia

References

External links
Extract of "Coro di Nuoro e dintorni: Storia e memoria" published by the Chorus of Nuoro in 1990

Italian choirs
Music in Sardinia
Musical groups established in 1952
1952 establishments in Italy